Josiah "Joe" Wedgwood III (12 January 1795 – 11 March 1880), a grandson of the English potter Josiah Wedgwood.

Wedgwood was the eldest son of Josiah Wedgwood II and his wife Elizabeth Allen. He was born nine days after the death of his grandfather. He was taken into the 1823 partnership in the Wedgwood business by his father and was employed there until 1842 when he retired to Leith Hill Place in Surrey.

He married his cousin Caroline Darwin (1800–1888), the daughter of Robert Darwin and Susannah Wedgwood and the sister of Charles Darwin.  They had four daughters, one of whom died in infancy:

 Sophia Mary Ann Wedgwood (1838–1839) died in infancy.
 Sophy Wedgwood (1842–1911)
 Margaret Susan Wedgwood (1843–1937), married The Reverend Arthur Vaughan Williams and their son was the composer Ralph Vaughan Williams.
 Lucy Caroline Wedgwood (1846–1919)

External links 
 Wedgwood Website
 https://web.archive.org/web/20070928162447/http://www.wedgwoodmuseum.org.uk/biogresults.asp?BiographySelection=36

Darwin–Wedgwood family
1795 births
1880 deaths
People from Maer, Staffordshire
19th-century English businesspeople